The Gross Walenstock is a mountain of the Urner Alps, located on the border between the cantons of Nidwalden and Obwalden in Central Switzerland. On its northern side it overlooks the Bannalpsee.

The Gross Walenstock is part of the group named Walenstöcke.

The closest localities are Oberrickenbach (Nidwalden) and Engelberg (Obwalden).

References

External links
 Gross Walenstock on Hikr

Mountains of the Alps
Mountains of Switzerland
Mountains of Obwalden
Mountains of Nidwalden
Nidwalden–Obwalden border